Hamuro Mitsutoshi (葉室光俊, Hamuro no Mitsutoshi, 1203 - 1276) was a major waka poet and Japanese nobleman active in the early Kamakura period.

External links 
E-text of his poems in Japanese

Japanese male poets
1203 deaths
1276 deaths
Minamoto clan
People of Kamakura-period Japan
13th-century Japanese poets